The principal environmental issues in Peru are water pollution, soil erosion, pollution and deforestation.  Although these issues are problematic and equally destructive, the Peruvian Environmental ministry has been developing regulation and laws to decrease the amount of pollution created in major cities and have been making policies in order to decrease the present deforestation rate in Peru.

Emissions

The Economic Commission for Latin America and the Caribbean (ECLAC) estimates that the economic losses related to climate change could reach over 15% of national gross domestic product (GDP) by 2100. In 2010, Peruvian greenhouse gas emissions represented only 0.4% of global emissions. However, emissions are rising nationwide – particularly in the energy and transport sectors. In an effort to combat this, the Government of Peru approved a law to establish a national greenhouse gas inventory system called INFOCARBONO. INFOCARBONO will enable different ministries to include greenhouse gas management in their work.

Deforestation
 
Deforestation is a growing problem in the world today, especially concerning the amazonian rainforest. In recent years deforestation has increased and deforestation now causes about 18% of green house emissions. Peru has the fourth largest area of rainforest in the world, which covers nearly 60% of its territory (70 million hectares). Unfortunately, the deforestation rate in Peru is .35%-.5%, which is approximately 250,000 hectares cut down annually. Deforestation in Peru is largely a result of subsistence farming resulting from migrant farmers exploiting the squatter's law which allows citizens to get public land if they can prove that they have lived there for 5 years. More deforestation though, is caused by both legal and illegal logging, mining, petroleum drilling and road development.

Antonio Brack Egg, the Environmental minister in Peru, has said that deforestation is mostly caused by Andean farmers migrating to the Amazon, by new roads and gold mining, he plays down the contribution to deforestation caused by oil and gas companies.

The Peruvian government has said that 80% of Peru's primary forest can be saved or protected. Mr. Brack has said that his ministry has calculated that Peru needs about $25 million a year for the next 10 years to be able to conserve at least 54 million hectares. That the Peruvian government has committed $5 million a year and is looking for $20 million a year from the international community. He continues that 52 million hectares will be divided into 4 parts, 17 million hectares of national parks which are already in existence, 12 million hectares for 42 indigenous groups, 12 million hectares for sustainable forestry development, and 5 million for Eco-tourism. Germany has already committed $5 million for the national Parks, Holland is interested in funding for indigenous groups and Mr. Brack is hoping for funds from Britain, Japan and Finland.  The Environmental minister is also asking for 3,000 environmental police to try and stop deforestation in remote areas.

Peru had a 2018 Forest Landscape Integrity Index mean score of 8.86/10, ranking it 14th globally out of 172 countries.

Peru forest figures
• Total forest area: 68,742,000 ha
• percentage of land area: 53.7%
• Primary forest cover: 61,065,000 ha
• percentage of land area: 47.7%
• percentage total forest area: 88.8%

Deforestation Rates, 2000–2005

• Annual change in forest cover:-94,200 ha
• Annual deforestation rate:-0.1%
• Change in deforestation rate since '90s: 1.3%
• Total forest loss since 1990:-1,414,000 ha
• Total forest loss since 1990:-2.0%

Primary or "Old-growth" forests

• Annual loss of primary forests:-224600 ha
• Annual deforestation rate:-0.4%
• Change in deforestation rate since '90s: 214.7%
• Primary forest loss since 1990:-1,123,000 ha
• Primary forest loss since 1990:-2.9%

Forest Classification

• Public: 83.1%
• Private: 15.2%
• Other: 1.7%
• Use
• Production: 36.7%
• Protection: 0.5%
• Conservation: 26.9%
• Social services: n.s.%
• Multiple purpose: 26%
• None or unknown: 9.9

Forest Area Breakdown

• Total area: 68,742,000 ha
• Primary: 61,065,000 ha
• Modified natural: 6,923,000 ha
• Semi-natural: n/a
• Production plantation: 754,000 ha
• Production plantation: n/a

Plantations

• Plantations, 2005: 754,000 ha
• percentage of total forest cover: 1.1%
• Annual change rate (00-05): 7,800,000 ha

• Carbon storage

• Above-ground biomass: n/a M t
• Below-ground biomass: n/a M t

Area annually affected by

• Fire: 35,000 ha
• Insects: n/a
• Diseases: n/a

Number of tree species in IUCN Red List

• Number of native tree species: 2,500
• Critically endangered: 33
• Endangered: 14
• Vulnerable: 54

Wood removal 2005

• Industrial roundwood: 1,891,000 m3 o.b.
• Wood fuel: 8,898,000 m3 o.b.

Value of forest products, 2005

• Industrial roundwood: $4,409,000
• Wood fuel: n/a
• Non-wood forest products (NWFPs): n/a
• Total Value: $4,409,000

Air pollution
Air pollution is a big problem in Peru, especially in Lima, the capital city, which is caused by industrial activity and vehicle emissions. In August 2006, air pollution in Lima surpassed the international standard by 122.1% The average concentration of PTS reached 166.57 micrograms per cubic meter, the international standard is 77 micrograms per cubic meter. In 2009, 1.5 tons of lead and 810 tons of sulphur dioxide, were emitted daily, which is four times the maximum allowed under Peruvian legislation.
The Peruvian government has created an alert system for high levels of pollution. There are three levels: watch, danger and emergency. During an emergency, children, pregnant women, the elderly and the ailing may be asked to stay indoors. Those who are healthy enough to continue with their lives outside are advised to cover their mouths and noses with scarves or handkerchiefs—but not facemasks, because according to government spokesperson Carlos Rojas "people don't want images that further dramatize the situation." Also Peru is using "super tree' technology, created by Tierra Nuestra to try and fight the air pollution in the major cities. The super tree acts like 1200 real trees, purifying the air. It sucks the outside air, and under thermodynamic pressure it combines the toxic particles in the air with water, and then pumps out clean air. Unfortunately, there are byproduct to the process, which include mud and non potable water. The Super Tree cleans approximately 200,000 cubic meters of air per day, eliminating air pollutions like carbon dioxide.

Water pollution
Water pollution sources in Peru include industrial waste, sewage and oil related waste. Peru has 1746 cu km of renewable water resources and 86% of this water is used for farming and 7% for industrial activity. In urban areas only 87% and in rural areas 62% of the population have access to clean water. In major cities 3.0 million tons of waste per year is created. President Alan García campaigned for a "water for all" strategic program, which proposed investment in 185 water supply and sanitation projects. The objective of this program is to expand potable water services from 76%-88% of households; Sanitation from 57%-77%; and sewage from 22%-100% by 2015.
Lake Titicaca is a specific concern to Puno in southeastern Peru because of its spiritual and historical significance. Contamination and pollution of the lake seriously affects the health of those that depend on it because current monitoring and testing of the lake is primitive and underfunded. Because of violence in and around the area the government is only now addressing the problem.
According to the Oxfam report, more than half of Peru's rivers are extremely polluted in the North the Chillón, Yauli and Mantaro in the central region; and the Chili River in the South.

Soil erosion
Peru's topography makes it susceptible to soil erosion. The coast of Peru is subject to wind erosion and water erosion is dominant in Sierra. Erosion also occurs in the High Selva when vegetation is cleared and in Low Selva where they get much rain on areas under slash and burn  practises. The use of contoured lines, cover crops and mulching can control erosion to some extent depending on the climate and the slope. In addition, traditional methods can be used to prevent erosion like terracing and agroforestry.

References

Environment of Peru
Peru